

Overview 
Elks Tower is located at 6446 Riverside Boulevard in Sacramento, California. Built in the style of the Italian Renaissance, it stands fourteen stories tall, and is home to the transmitting tower for the KRXQ. At the time of its construction, it not only was a home for the Elks, it also had approximately 100 hotel rooms and a storefront. The Benevolent and Protective Order of Elks, the group which commissioned the building, is a fraternal order founded in 1868.

History

Early history 
This led to the construction of a new, 226-foot-tall Elks Temple, built out of brick and steel, located at the northeast corner of 11th and J Street. It was dedicated as the home of Sacramento Elks Lodge No. 6 on June 22, 1926.

Late 1960s 
In 1968, the thirteenth floor of the building became home to the newly created 98.5 FM radio station, today's KRXQ.

Amenities and configuration of the building during the late 1960s

Current use 
The Elks Tower is now a venue which can be booked for events, such as weddings and parties. In 2019, Steve Ayers, the current owner of the building at the time, requested a reconsideration of a gambling license for a cardroom at Elk's Tower; this was ultimately denied by the California Gambling Control Commission.

Architecture

Radio station 
The Elks Tower has been home to the transmitting tower for 98.5 FM KZAP since the late 1960s.

Further reading and references

See also 
 List of Elks buildings

References

External links 
 

Historic sites in California
Elks buildings
Buildings and structures in Sacramento, California
Clubhouses in California
Towers in California
1926 in California